Maiestas setosa (formerly Recilia setosa) is a species of bug from the Cicadellidae family that is endemic to Pakistan. It was formerly placed within Recilia, but a 2009 revision moved it to Maiestas.

References

Insects described in 1988
Endemic fauna of Pakistan
Hemiptera of Asia
Maiestas